The Zero-One United States Heavyweight Championship was a professional wrestling title in Japanese promotion Pro Wrestling Zero1. It was created on January 6, 2003, with Steve Corino defeating Masato Tanaka. In addition to Japan, it has recently been frequently defended in various independent companies in the United States.

The title was created at a time when the company was known as Pro Wrestling Zero-One, originally naming it the Zero-One United States Heavyweight Championship; on July 4, 2004, following Zero-One joining the National Wrestling Alliance (NWA), the title was renamed the NWA/Zero-One United States Heavyweight Championship. On October 26, 2004, Zero-One left the NWA, removing its initials from the title and renaming it the Zero-One United States Openweight Championship. When the promotion's name was changed to Zero1-Max in 2005, the championship title followed. On March 25, 2007, the title again switched its name, this time to the Zero1-Max International Championship; however, on June 13, 2007, the International title was apparently stricken from the record, and was reverted to the US title. On April 12, 2008, it was renamed back to its original title by Steve Corino, in honor of Zero1-Max's late founder Shinya Hashimoto. There have been a total of 11 recognized champions who have had a combined 18 official reigns.

Title history

Names

Reigns

See also
AWA Superstars of Wrestling United States Championship
Wrestling Superstars Live
Pro Wrestling Zero1
Zero1 World Heavyweight Championship
Zero1 International Junior Heavyweight Championship
NWA United National Heavyweight Championship
NWA Intercontinental Tag Team Championship
NWA International Lightweight Tag Team Championship

References

Pro Wrestling Zero1 championships
Heavyweight wrestling championships
United States professional wrestling championships